Events from the year 1649 in art.

Events
 Rembrandt and Gerard Dou are painting during this year.

Paintings 

 Aert van der Neer - Landscape with Windmill (1647–49)
 Paulus Potter - A Young Bull and Two Cows in a Meadow
 Nicolas Poussin (some dates approximate)
 The Holy Family
 The Judgement of Solomon
 Vision of St Paul
 Two self-portraits
 David Ryckaert - Suffering of the Peasants
 Salomon van Ruysdael - Ferry on a River
 Diego Velázquez - Portrait of Juan de Pareja (approximate date)

Births 
January 12 - Jacques Carrey, French painter and draughtsman (died 1726)
July 4 - William Lodge, English engraver and printmaker (died 1689)
 date unknown
Bon Boullogne, French painter (died 1717)
Elias van den Broeck (or Broek), Dutch artist (died 1708)
Paolo Antonio Paderna, Italian painter of the Baroque period born in Bologna (died 1708)
Hermione van Rijn, second child of Rembrandt and Saskia van Uylenburgh
Giovanni Stefano Robatto, Italian painter for churches in Genoa (died 1733)
Cristóbal de Villalpando, Mexican painter  (died 1714)
Jan van der Brugge, Flemish Baroque painter and engraver (died 1699)

Deaths 
January 22 - Alessandro Turchi, Italian painter (born 1578)
April 1 - Juan Bautista Mayno, Spanish painter of the Baroque period (born 1569)
June 18 - Juan Martínez Montañés, also known as el Dios de la Madera, Spanish sculptor (born 1568)
June 20 - Maria Tesselschade Visscher, Dutch poet and engraver (born 1594)
June 28 - Gioacchino Assereto, Italian painter, active in Genoa (born 1600)
July 29 - David Teniers the Elder, Flemish painter (born 1582)
August 16 - Henricus Hondius II, Dutch painter (born 1573)
October - Isaac van Ostade, Dutch genre and landscape painter (born 1621)
November 2 - Antonio Barbalonga, Italian painter (born 1600)
date unknown
Jan Baptist Barbé, Flemish engraver (born 1578)
Paolo Antonio Barbieri, Italian painter who was the brother of Guercino (born 1603)
Aniella di Beltrano,  Italian woman painter (born 1613)
Alfonso Boschi, Italian painter of the Baroque period, active mainly in Florence (born 1615)
Sebastiano Brunetti, Italian painter active in his native Bologna (born unknown)
Andrea Camassei, Italian painter active in Rome under the patronage of the Barberini (born 1602)
Castellino Castello, Italian painter, active mainly in Genoa (born 1580)
Giovanni Battista Coriolano, Italian engraver (born 1590)
Juan de Zurbarán, Spanish Baroque painter (born 1620)
Cornelis Willemsz Eversdijck, Dutch portrait painter (born unknown)
Francesco Gessi, Italian painter of frescoes (born 1588)
Abraham Matthijs, Flemish Baroque painter (born 1581)
Hendrik van Steenwijk II, Dutch Baroque painter of architectural interiors (born 1580)
probable - Ludovicus Neefs, Flemish painter (born 1617)

References

 
Years of the 17th century in art
1640s in art